Brăești is a commune in Iași County, Western Moldavia, Romania. It is composed of five villages: Albești, Brăești, Buda, Cristești and Rediu.

References

Communes in Iași County
Localities in Western Moldavia